Scenedesmus dimorphus is a freshwater unicellular green algae in the class Chlorophyceae. The name means "having two forms".

Synonyms

Basionym
 Achnanthes dimorpha Turpin

Homotypic synonyms
 Scenedesmus obliquus var. dimorphus (Turpin) Hansgirg
 Scenedesmus acutus var. dimorphus (Turpin) Rabenhorst
 Achnanthes dimorpha Turpin, 1828

Heterotypic synonyms
 Scenedesmus antennatus Brébisson in Ralfs
 Scenedesmus costulatus Chodat
 Scenedesmus acutus var. obliquus Rabenhorst

See also
 Algaculture

References

External links
 Picture of Scenedesmus dimorphus

High lipid content microalgae
Sphaeropleales